Charged Records was a street punk record label that was formed by Jake Kolatis of The Casualties in 1998. The label released albums from Antidote, The Casualties, The Agrestix, and The Virus, among others. The labeled ceased operations in 2008.

Notable artists
 The Casualties
 The Virus
 Monster Squad
 Wednesday Night Heroes
 The Escaped
 Bludwulf
 Antidote

See also
 List of record labels

References

External links
Charged Records on Myspace

American record labels
Punk record labels
Hardcore record labels